"Jane Says" is a song by American rock band Jane's Addiction. It was released as a promotional single in 1988, becoming the band's first chart entry on the Alternative Songs chart, peaking at #6.

It was first released in semi-live format on the group's 1987 debut album, Jane's Addiction. It was re-recorded in the studio for the follow-up album, Nothing's Shocking. The Nothing's Shocking version is the most widely known version of the song, featuring steel drums that are not present on the cut from the self-titled album. A true live version appears on the band's 1997 new/live/out-take compilation Kettle Whistle.

It is one of Jane's Addiction's most famous songs and frequently ends their concerts.

Jane Bainter
The title refers to lead singer Perry Farrell's ex-housemate, Jane Bainter, who was the muse, inspiration, and the namesake of the band. In a 2001 interview with the Los Angeles Times, Bainter confirmed and clarified many things about the song; she was dating an abusive man named Sergio and that she did wear wigs, but stated she never sold her body for sex. In the same interview, Bainter said she had been clean for eight years and did eventually get to go to Spain.

Composition
"Jane Says" uses only two chords for most of the song. The original recording from Jane's Addiction features bongos and is sung in a lower register than later versions. The version that appears on Nothing's Shocking makes extensive use of steel drums played by Stephen Perkins in place of the original's bongos.  The live version from Kettle Whistle interpolates the two versions, opening with an extended bongo introduction, over Perry Ferrell's scat vocals, before abruptly shifting to steel drum one measure before starting the verse.

The song format does not follow standard verse–chorus form, instead featuring three verses and a bridge section, following a traditional AABA form.  Each verse ends with a short refrain ("I'm gonna kick tomorrow...") repeated twice.  The song concludes on a coda consisting of a repeat of the bridge.

Track listing

Charts

Nothing's Shocking version

Kettle Whistle version

In popular culture
The song was made available to download on November 29, 2011 for use in the Rock Band music video game series.

References

1987 songs
1988 debut singles
1997 singles
Jane's Addiction songs
Songs about drugs
Songs written by Eric Avery
Songs written by Perry Farrell
Warner Records singles